Gil Van Moerzeke (born 28 January 1998) is a Belgian professional footballer who plays as a centre-back for Lokeren-Temse in the Belgian Second Amateur Division.

Club career
In 2008 Van Moerzeke joined Lokeren as an 8 year old, after two years at SK Grembergen. On 26 January 2018, Van Moerzeke moved signed his first professional contract with Lokeren keeping him with the club until 2020. Van Moerzeke made his professional debut for Lokeren in a 1–1 Belgian First Division A tie with Charleroi on 11 February 2018.

References

External links
 Soccerway Profile
 Sporting Profile

1998 births
Living people
Sportspeople from Sint-Niklaas
Footballers from East Flanders
Belgian footballers
K.S.C. Lokeren Oost-Vlaanderen players
Belgian Pro League players
Association football defenders